Tomelloso is a municipality in the province of Ciudad Real, Castile-La Mancha, Spain. It has a population of 33,548 (2005).

Main sights
Posada de los Portales (late 17th century)
Town Hall, rebuilt in 1904
Church of the Asunción de Nuestra Señora (16th century)
Museum Antonio López Torres

Twin towns
 Bir Lehlu, Western Sahara
 Ibi, Spain
 Lepe, Spain
 Niort, France

References

Municipalities in the Province of Ciudad Real